Cottrell is a surname. Notable people with the surname include:

Alan Cottrell (1919–2012), British metallurgist and physicist
Ann Cottrell Free, American journalist
Anthony Cottrell, one of the investors in the Port Phillip Association
Blair Cottrell, an Australian far-right extremist
Chris Cottrell, American entrepreneur
Con Cottrell, Irish sportsperson
Dorthia Cottrell (born 1986), American singer and musician
Erin Cottrell (born 1975), American actress
Frank Cottrell-Boyce, British screenwriter and novelist
Frederick Gardner Cottrell (1877–1948), American inventor and physical chemist
George Cottrell (born 1993), British former politician, financier, and convicted felon
George Cottrell (rugby) (1881-1963), English rugby union and rugby league footballer
Graham Cottrell (born 1945), English cricketer and teacher
James La Fayette Cottrell, American politician from Alabama
Jim Cottrell, American football linebacker 
Leonard Cottrell, British writer and archaeologist
Louis Cottrell Sr. (1878–1927), jazz drummer
Louis Cottrell Jr. (1911–1978), jazz reedist
Myron Cottrell, founder and owner of TPI Specialties
Nathan Cottrell (born 1996), American football player
Patrick Cottrell (born 1981), American writer
Peter Cottrell, British historian and novelist
Porter Cottrell, American professional bodybuilder
Raymond Cottrell, Seventh-day Adventist theologian
Robert Cottrell (1815–1880), coachbuilder and politician in South Australia
Sheldon Cottrell, West Indian cricket player and Jamaican Defense Force soldier
Stephen Cottrell, Bishop of Reading
T. J. Cottrell, American football player
Ted Cottrell, defensive coordinator for the San Diego Chargers
Thomas Cottrell, Canadian politician from New Brunswick
Travis Cottrell, American contemporary Christian music (CCM) artist, songwriter, author and worship leader
William Cottrell, convicted arsonist

See also
Cottrell, Oregon, an unincorporated community in Oregon, United States
Mount Cottrell, Victoria, a mountain and community in Australia
2026 Cottrell, an asteroid
Cottrell atmosphere, a Materials Science Concept
Lomer-Cottrell junction, a configuration of dislocations